Berghamn is an island in the north of the Swedish sector of the Bay of Bothnia, in the Kalix archipelago.

Description

The north side of the island has a  sandy beach. A cold spring near the beach provides clean water.
The island is rugged, and is covered in moors and forest. The central hill contains caves, and can be reached by a footpath that crosses the island. 
There is a dramatic view from the summit of the neighboring islands of Likskär, Renskär, Getskär, Rånön and Hastaskäret.

References
Citations

Sources

Swedish islands in the Baltic
Islands of Norrbotten County
Kalix